A leadership election was held by the United Malays National Organisation (UMNO) party on 24 April 1987. It was won by incumbent Prime Minister and President of UMNO, Mahathir Mohamad.

Supreme Council election results
Source

Permanent Chairman

Deputy Permanent Chairman

President

Deputy President

Vice Presidents

Supreme Council Members

See also
1990 Malaysian general election
Third Mahathir cabinet

References

1987 elections in Malaysia
United Malays National Organisation leadership election
United Malays National Organisation leadership elections